Pope Eugene III (1145–1153) created sixteen cardinals in nine consistories:

Consistories

9 March 1145

Pietro — cardinal-deacon of S. Maria in Via Lata, † after 1148

21 September 1145

Guido de Crema — cardinal-deacon of S. Maria in Portico, cardinal-priest of S. Maria in Trastevere (14 March 1158), Antipope Paschalis III (22 April 1164), † 20 September 1168

25 February 1149

Grecus — cardinal-deacon of SS. Sergio e Bacco, † 30 August 1149

16 December 1149

Nicholas Breakspeare, C.R.St.-Ruf — cardinal-bishop of Albano, Pope Hadrian IV (4 December 1154), † 1 September 1159

22 September 1150

Rolando of Siena — cardinal-deacon of SS. Cosma e Damiano, cardinal-priest of S. Marco (2 March 1151), Pope Alexander III (7 September 1159), † 30 August 1181
Giovanni Gaderisio, Can.Reg. — cardinal-deacon of SS. Sergio e Bacco, cardinal-priest of S. Anastasia (14 March 1158), † April 1182

2 March 1151

Gerard — cardinal-priest of S. Stefano in Celiomonte, † 1158
Cencio de Gregorio — cardinal-deacon of S. Maria in Aquiro, then cardinal-priest of S. Lorenzo in Lucina (21 February 1152) and cardinal-bishop of Porto e S. Rufina (April 1154), † 1157

21 December 1151

Hugo, O.Cist. — cardinal-bishop of Ostia, † 1 December 1158

21 February 1152

Giovanni da Sutri — cardinal-priest of SS. Giovanni e Paolo, † 1180
Enrico Pisano, O.Cist. — cardinal-priest of SS. Nereo ed Achilleo, † 1166
Gerard de Namur — cardinal-deacon of the Holy Roman Church, then cardinal-deacon of S. Maria in Via Lata (19 December 1152), † 1155
Ottone da Brescia — cardinal-deacon of the Holy Roman Church, then cardinal-deacon of S. Nicola in Carcere (19 December 1152),  † 1174

23 May 1152

Giovanni Morrone — cardinal-priest of SS. Silvestro e Martino, † ca. 1167/68
Bernard de Rennes, O.Cist. — cardinal-deacon of the Holy Roman Church, then cardinal-deacon of SS. Cosma e Damiano (19 December 1152), † 1 May 1154
Ildebrando Grassi, Can.Reg. — cardinal-deacon of the Holy Roman Church, then cardinal-deacon of S. Eustachio (19 December 1152), cardinal-priest of SS. XII Apostoli (21 December 1156), † 8 November 1178.

"Presumed cardinals"
The following other persons are also listed as cardinals created by Eugene III, but they should be excluded from that list because they were never promoted to the cardinalate or are confused with another cardinals ("presumed cardinals"):

Besides, it is often claimed that cardinals Jordan of S. Susanna, Bernardo of S. Clemente and Cinzio of SS. Sergio e Bacco were created by Eugene III, but they were all promoted by Lucius II as "cardinal-deacons of the Holy Roman Church"; Eugene III only gave them the titular churches.

Notes

Bibliography

Barbara Zenker: Die Mitglieder des Kardinalkollegiums von 1130 bis 1159. Würzburg 1964, S. 224-225
Johannes M. Brixius: Die Mitglieder des Kardinalkollegiums von 1130-1181. Berlin 1912, S. 53-57
Michael Horn: Studien zur Geschichte Papst Eugens III.(1145-1153), Peter Lang Verlag 1992
Philipp Jaffé, Regesta pontificum Romanorum ab condita Ecclesia ad annum post Christum natum MCXCVIII, vol. II, Berlin 1888 
J. P. Migne: Eugenius III: Epistolae et Privilegia

Eugene III
College of Cardinals
12th-century Catholicism